Walter Alison Phillips  (21 October 1864 – 28 October 1950) was an English historian, a specialist in the history of Europe in the 19th century. From 1914 to 1939 he was the first holder of the Lecky chair of History in Trinity College, Dublin. Most of his writing is in the name of W. Alison Phillips, and he was sometimes referred to as Alison Phillips.

A former president of the Oxford Union and special correspondent of The Times newspaper, he was a prolific author, including contributions to the Encyclopædia Britannica, of which for eight years he was chief assistant editor.

Early life
The son of John and Jane Phillips of Epsom in Surrey, Phillips was educated at Merchant Taylors' School, which he left in 1882, then at Merton College, Oxford, where he was an exhibitioner, and lastly from 1886 at St John's, where he was Senior Scholar. He graduated BA in 1885, with first class honours in History, and MA in 1889.

In the Michaelmas term of 1886, he was President of the Oxford Union. On 7 June 1887, as a guest in the Cambridge Union, he supported the motion "That in the opinion of this House it is desirable to concede Home Rule for Ireland", while Sir John Gorst, a former Solicitor General, came to speak against the motion.

Career
At first, Phillips concentrated his efforts on writing. His first book, published in 1896, was a translation of selected poems of Walther von der Vogelweide, followed the next year by The War of Greek Independence, 1821 to 1833. In 1901 appeared his Modern Europe, 1815–1899.

From 1903 to 1911, Phillips was Chief Assistant Editor of the projected 11th edition of the Encyclopædia Britannica, serving under Hugh Chisholm, who was editor-in-chief. In 1912, he went to South America as a Special Correspondent of The Times newspaper, and then in 1913 was on the staff of The Times. In 1914 he was appointed Lecky Professor of Modern History in Trinity College, Dublin, the first holder of the new chair, in which he remained until his retirement in 1939. From 1939 until his death he was an honorary Fellow of his old Oxford college, Merton.

Phillips was strongly opposed to Irish Home Rule and once declared that "Ireland is not a nation, but two peoples separated by a deeper gulf than that dividing Ireland from Great Britain". His 1923 book The Revolution in Ireland 1906–1923 was criticized for being too partisan of the Unionist point of view.

By 1922, Phillips was a member of the Royal Irish Academy (MRIA). Outside his own specialism in European history, he contributed articles to the Encyclopædia Britannica on musical and literary subjects, including the Nibelungenlied.

Publications
 
 
 
 
 
 chapters by W. Alison Phillips: I: "The Congresses, 1815–22"; VI: "Greece and the Balkan Peninsula"; XVII: "Mehemet Ali"
 
Many articles for the Encyclopædia Britannica, Eleventh Edition, signed by the initials "W. A. P."; some published separately on the outbreak of the First World War:
 
 
 
  [in 3 volumes]

References

External links
Works by W. Alison Phillips at ebooksread.com
Walter Alison Phillips at Wikisource — includes list of articles authored by him
 

1864 births
1950 deaths
Academics of Trinity College Dublin
Alumni of Merton College, Oxford
Alumni of St John's College, Oxford
English historians
English male journalists
Fellows of Trinity College Dublin
Members of the Royal Irish Academy
People educated at Merchant Taylors' School, Northwood
Presidents of the Oxford Union
The Times people
British war correspondents
Encyclopædia Britannica
Historic Society of Lancashire and Cheshire